The bombing of Bahrain in World War II was part of an effort by the Italian Royal Air Force (Regia Aeronautica) to strike at the British interests wherever possible in the Middle East. While the mission caused little damage, it was successful in forcing the diversion of already-limited Allied resources to an obscure theater originally thought to be safe.

Background

On 10 June 1940, the Kingdom of Italy declared war on the French Republic and the United Kingdom. The Italian invasion of France was short-lived and the French signed an armistice with the Italians on 25 June, three days after France's armistice with Germany.  This left the British and the forces of the Commonwealth of Nations for the Italians to contend with in the Middle East.

In summer 1940, the Italian leader and Prime Minister Benito Mussolini received a plan to destroy the oil fields in Bahrain in order to disrupt the oil supplies to the British Navy. The plan was suggested by the Italian test pilot, Air Force Captain Paolo Moci.

Bahrain and Dhahran

Early on 19 October 1940, four Italian SM.82 bombers attacked American-operated oil refineries in the British Protectorate of Bahrain, damaging the local refineries. The raid also struck Dhahran in Saudi Arabia, but causing only some minor damage.

Indeed, in order to strike the British-controlled oil refineries at Manama in the Persian Gulf, these SM.82 bombers undertook a flight of 4,200 km (2,610 mi), lasting 15 hours at 270 km/h (170 mph), that was for the time arguably a record for a bombing mission. The force took off from the island of Rhodes, in the Aegean Sea, and each aircraft carried a bomb load of 1,500 kgs (3,310 lbs). This long-range action was successful, taking the target totally by surprise, and the SM.82s landed without problems at Zula, Eritrea. The Italian airplanes started their flight from Europe, attacked refineries in Asia and landed back in Africa (Italian Eritrea).

During the attack 132 bombs of 15 kgs each were dropped, that heavily damaged two refineries.

The raid caused the Allies some concerns, forcing them to upgrade their defenses. This, more than the limited amount of damage caused, further stretched Allied military resources.

Rome declared that their bombers had set a new distance record, covering 3,000 miles on the outgoing trip from bases located in the island of Rhodes. American magazine Time wrote that the Italians insisted that the planes had been refueled from submarine tankers though in actuality, the planes had simply been loaded with fuel.

Ettore Muti, party secretary of the National Fascist Party, took part in the Bahrain raid and in at least one of the bombings of Haifa.

The Bahrain raid was followed by other long-distance Italian raids on Ethiopia and Eritrea in 1942, and would have been repeated -with an advanced SM.82 bomber- in a raid on New York City in summer 1943 that never became true. Even a commercial aerial trip was done between Rome and Tokyo in summer 1942.

See also

 Italian bombing of Mandatory Palestine in World War II
 Italian Royal Air Force (Regia Aeronautica)

Footnotes

Bibliography
Lembo, Daniele. "SIAI SM.82 Marsupiale". Aerei Nella Storia, Issue 22. Parma, Italy: West-ward Edizioni, 2002, p. 10–31.

Bahrain
Bahrain
20th century in Bahrain
1940 in Bahrain
1940 in Saudi Arabia
Middle East theatre of World War II
World War II strategic bombing conducted by Italy
Aerial operations and battles of World War II
Airstrikes
October 1940 events